Spind Church is a parish church of the Church of Norway in Farsund Municipality in Agder county, Norway. It is located in the village of Rødland in the Spind area to the east of the town of Farsund. It is one of the three churches for the Farsund parish which is part of the Lister og Mandal prosti (deanery) in the Diocese of Agder og Telemark. The white, wooden church was built in a cruciform design in 1776 using plans drawn up by the architect Lars Albertsen Øvrenes. The church seats about 500 people.

History
The earliest existing historical records of the church date back to the year 1328, but the old stave church was likely built during the 1200s. After the new church was completed, the old medieval church was torn down.

See also
List of churches in Agder og Telemark

References

Farsund
Churches in Agder
Wooden churches in Norway
Cruciform churches in Norway
18th-century Church of Norway church buildings
Churches completed in 1776
13th-century establishments in Norway